The Biskinik is a monthly publication, a monthly newspaper published in The State of Oklahoma, sent free to registered Choctaw Nation tribal members upon request. It was started in 1997. It is published by the Choctaw Nation in Durant, Oklahoma. The Library of Congress shows a record of its publication from 1978 to 1981 and from 1983 to the present.

The publication shares its name with the Choctaw word for a speckled, scissortail species of woodpecker. According to Choctaw legend, the Bishinik was one of two birds to escape the Great Flood and was known as the "little Chahta news bird". The bird was said to warn Choctaws when someone was approaching by tapping out messages on trees.

References

Monthly magazines published in the United States
Choctaw culture
Magazines established in 1997
Magazines published in Oklahoma
Native American magazines